Beer goddess may refer to:

Dea Latis, Celtic goddess of beer.
Mbaba Mwana Waresa, Zulu goddess of the rainbow, agriculture, rain and beer.
Nephthys, Egyptian goddess of beer.
Ninkasi, Sumerian goddess of beer.
Nokhubulwane, see Mbaba Mwana Waresa.
Siduri, wise female divinity of beer in the Epic of Gilgamesh.
Siris (goddess), Mesopotamian goddess of beer.
Tenenet, Egyptian goddess of childbirth and beer.

See also
List of deities of wine and beer